James N. Beck (November 4, 1923 – February 10, 1973) was an American politician. He served as a Democratic member for the 33rd district of the Florida House of Representatives.

Beck was born in Pine Castle, Florida. In 1967 Beck became the first member for the newly established 33rd district of the Florida House of Representatives, serving until 1968.

Beck died in February 1973, at the age of 49.

References 

1923 births
1973 deaths
People from Florida
Democratic Party members of the Florida House of Representatives
20th-century American politicians